Laetitia Moussard (born 2 July 1971) is a French former basketball player who competed in the 2000 Summer Olympics. She was born in Toulouse.

References

1971 births
Living people
Sportspeople from Toulouse
French women's basketball players
Olympic basketball players of France
Basketball players at the 2000 Summer Olympics